Uherské Hradiště District is a district (okres) within the Zlín Region of the Czech Republic. Its capital is the town of Uherské Hradiště.

List of municipalities
Babice -
Bánov -
Bílovice -
Bojkovice -
Boršice u Blatnice -
Boršice -
Břestek -
Březolupy -
Březová -
Buchlovice -
Bystřice pod Lopeníkem -
Částkov -
Dolní Němčí -
Drslavice -
Hluk -
Horní Němčí -
Hostějov -
Hostětín -
Hradčovice -
Huštěnovice -
Jalubí -
Jankovice -
Kněžpole -
Komňa -
Korytná -
Košíky -
Kostelany nad Moravou -
Kudlovice -
Kunovice -
Lopeník -
Medlovice -
Mistřice -
Modrá -
Nedachlebice -
Nedakonice -
Nezdenice -
Nivnice -
Ořechov -
Ostrožská Lhota -
Ostrožská Nová Ves -
Osvětimany -
Pašovice -
Pitín -
Podolí -
Polešovice -
Popovice -
Prakšice -
Rudice -
Salaš -
Slavkov -
Staré Hutě -
Staré Město -
Starý Hrozenkov -
Strání -
Stříbrnice -
Stupava -
Suchá Loz -
Šumice -
Sušice -
Svárov -
Topolná -
Traplice -
Tučapy -
Tupesy -
Uherské Hradiště -
Uherský Brod -
Uherský Ostroh -
Újezdec -
Vápenice -
Vážany -
Velehrad -
Veletiny -
Vlčnov -
Vyškovec -
Záhorovice -
Žítková
Zlámanec -
Zlechov

References

 
Districts of the Czech Republic